Diores is a genus of spiders in the family Zodariidae.

Species
, the World Spider Catalog accepted the following extant species:

Diores annetteae Jocqué, 1990 – South Africa
Diores anomalus Jocqué, 1990 – Madagascar
Diores auricula Tucker, 1920 – Zimbabwe, South Africa
Diores bifurcatus Tucker, 1920 – South Africa
Diores bivattatus Simon, 1893 (type species) – South Africa
Diores bouilloni Benoit, 1965 – Congo
Diores brevis Jocqué, 1990 – Kenya
Diores capensis Tucker, 1920 – South Africa
Diores chelinda Jocqué, 1990 – Malawi
Diores cognatus O. Pickard-Cambridge, 1904 – South Africa
Diores damara Jocqué, 1990 – Namibia
Diores decipiens Jocqué, 1990 – South Africa
Diores delesserti Caporiacco, 1949 – Kenya
Diores delicatulus Lawrence, 1936 – Botswana, Zimbabwe
Diores dowsetti Jocqué, 1990 – South Africa
Diores druryi Tucker, 1920 – Namibia
Diores femoralis Jocqué, 1990 – South Africa
Diores filomenae Jocqué, 2003 – Comoros
Diores geraerti Jocqué, 1990 – Cameroon, Congo
Diores godfreyi Hewitt, 1919 – South Africa
Diores griswoldorum Jocqué, 1990 – Namibia
Diores immaculatus Tullgren, 1910 – Tanzania
Diores initialis Jocqué, 1990 – Kenya, Tanzania
Diores jonesi Tucker, 1920 – South Africa
Diores kenyae Berland, 1920 – Kenya
Diores kibonotensis Tullgren, 1910 – Tanzania
Diores leleupi Jocqué, 1990 – South Africa
Diores lemaireae Jocqué, 1990 – Malawi
Diores lesserti Lawrence, 1952 – South Africa, Lesotho
Diores magicus Jocqué & Dippenaar-Schoeman, 1992 – Zimbabwe
Diores malaissei Jocqué, 1990 – Congo
Diores milloti Jocqué, 1990 – Madagascar
Diores miombo Jocqué, 1990 – Malawi
Diores monospinus Jocqué, 1990 – Malawi
Diores murphyorum Jocqué, 1990 – Kenya, Tanzania
Diores naivashae Berland, 1920 – Kenya
Diores namibia Jocqué, 1990 – Namibia
Diores patellaris Jocqué, 1990 – Malawi
Diores pauper Jocqué, 1990 – South Africa
Diores poweri Tucker, 1920 – South Africa, Lesotho
Diores radulifer Simon, 1910 – South Africa
Diores rectus Jocqué, 1990 – Malawi, South Africa
Diores recurvatus Jocqué, 1990 – South Africa
Diores russelli Jocqué, 1990 – Botswana
Diores salisburyensis Tucker, 1920 – Namibia, Botswana, Zimbabwe, Zambia
Diores seiugatus Jocqué, 1986 – Comoros
Diores sequax Jocqué, 1990 – South Africa
Diores setosus Tucker, 1920 – South Africa
Diores silvestris Jocqué, 1990 – South Africa
Diores similis Russell-Smith & Jocqué, 2015 – Tanzania
Diores simoni O. Pickard-Cambridge, 1904 – South Africa
Diores simplicior Jocqué, 1990 – Malawi
Diores spinulosus Jocqué, 1990 – South Africa
Diores strandi Caporiacco, 1949 – Kenya, Rwanda, Congo
Diores tavetae Berland, 1920 – Kenya
Diores termitophagus Jocqué & Dippenaar-Schoeman, 1992 – South Africa
Diores triangulifer Simon, 1910 – Namibia, South Africa
Diores triarmatus Lessert, 1929 – Congo
Diores univittatus Tullgren, 1910 – Tanzania
Diores youngai Jocqué, 1990 – South Africa

References

Zodariidae
Araneomorphae genera